Ronald D. Young Jr. (born January 10, 1977) is an American former POW in the 2003 Gulf military action against Iraq who later became a contestant in the reality show The Amazing Race 7.  Young is also an Eagle Scout.

Biography
Young grew up in Lithia Springs, Georgia and lives in Villa Rica, Georgia. He graduated from Douglas County High School in Douglasville, Georgia, studied mechanical engineering at Southern Polytechnic State University in Marietta, Georgia, before joining the Army.

At the time of his becoming a POW in Iraq his father was living in Lithia Springs, Georgia.

Iraqi POW

Young was among seven POWs who were taken prisoner by Iraqi forces in the 2003 invasion. Back then, he was a Chief Warrant Officer whose Apache Longbow helicopter crashed in Karbala on March 24, 2003.

The Iraqi forces kept the two with the members of the 507th Maintenance Company who were earlier captured along with their comrade Jessica Lynch. The 507th POWs included Patrick Miller, Joseph Hudson, Shoshana Johnson, James Riley, and Edgar Hernandez. They were rescued soon after on April 13, 2003.

The Amazing Race
In 2004, he competed on The Amazing Race 7 together with his then girlfriend, beauty queen Kelly McCorkle. They were billed as the "Former POW/Beauty Queen couple" and his back story about his POW days were mentioned in the show. Young, like almost all contestants who competed there (except for well-known Survivor contestants Rob Mariano and Amber Brkich), was identified only by his first name. Ron & Kelly's relationship was strained during the competition and they broke up after the show but they still have remained friends. They eventually finished third when in San Juan, Puerto Rico they "went to the regional airport instead of the international airport," Young said, going to the wrong airport caused them to miss their flight.

The Amazing Race 7 finishes

An  placement with a double-dagger indicates that Ron and Kelly were the last to arrive at a pit stop in a non-elimination leg.
 An italicized placement means it was Ron and Kelly's placement at the midpoint of a double leg.
A  indicates Ron and Kelly were on the receiving end of the Yield.

Roadblocks performed by Young are bolded 

Notes

Later life
Young became part of an urban legend when a viral email claiming that the Red Lobster in the town Young's unit was based refused to donate money to the Young family.  Even though the Army "highly discourages spouses soliciting businesses on behalf of families," and that "no business should feel strong-armed into donating" Red Lobster had actually wanted to give money but had run out of gift certificates.

See also
American P.O.W.s in 2003 Iraq War
List of Eagle Scouts

References

1977 births
Living people
Iraq War prisoners of war
United States Army personnel of the Iraq War
The Amazing Race (American TV series) contestants
United States Army officers
American Latter Day Saints
American prisoners of war
Latter Day Saints from Georgia (U.S. state)
People from Villa Rica, Georgia
People from Lithia Springs, Georgia
People from Douglasville, Georgia
Prisoners of war held by Iraq